The Garifuna are an ethnic group of the Americas comprising descendants of Island Carib, Arawak, and West African peoples.

Garifuna may also refer to:
Garifuna language, an Arawakan language spoken by the Garifuna
Garifuna Americans, American citizens or resident aliens of Garifuna descent
Garifuna music
Garifuna Settlement Day
Garifuna, a genus of flies

Language and nationality disambiguation pages